Colleen Hoover (born December 11, 1979) is an American author who primarily writes novels in the romance and young adult fiction genres. She is best known for her 2016 romance novel, It Ends with Us. Many of her works were self-published, before being picked up by a publishing house. Hoover has sold approximately 20 million books, as of October 2022.

Early and personal life 
Hoover was born on December 11, 1979, in Sulphur Springs, Texas, to Vannoy Fite and Eddie Fennell. She grew up in Saltillo, Texas, and she graduated from Saltillo High School in 1998. She married Heath Hoover in 2000, and they have three sons.  Hoover graduated from Texas A&M-Commerce with a degree in social work. She worked various social work and teaching jobs, prior to starting her career as an author.

Career 
In November 2011, Hoover began writing her debut novel, Slammed, with no intention of getting published. She was inspired by a lyric, "decide what to be and go be it,” from an Avett Brothers song, "Head Full of Doubt/Road Full of Promise," and she incorporated Avett Brothers lyrics throughout the story. Hoover self-published Slammed in January 2012. She states that she published the novel so her mother, who had just gotten an Amazon Kindle, could read it.  A sequel, Point of Retreat, was published in February 2012. After a few months, Slammed was reviewed and given five stars by book blogger Maryse Black, and afterward, sales rapidly rocketed for Hoover's first two books. Slammed and Point of Retreat reached #8 and #18, respectively, on the New York Times Best Seller list in August of that year. Atria Books picked up the novels and republished them on August 10, 2012. A third book in the series, This Girl, was published in April 2013. After the success of Slammed, Hoover quit her job in the social work field to become a full-time writer.

Hoover's novel, Hopeless, was self-published in December 2012.  The plot line, which is that of a girl who was home-schooled throughout her elementary education, before going to a public high school, reached #1 on the New York Times Best Seller list on January 20, and the novel remained there for three weeks. It was the first self-published novel to ever top the list. A companion novel, Losing Hope, was published that July.

Finding Cinderella is a free novella that Hoover published in 2014.  It features several of the characters depicted in her novels, Hopeless and Losing Hope. A paperback was released with several bonus features, such as a new epilogue and Hoover's own "Cinderella story". Maybe Someday, published in March 2014, was the first novel of a small series about a boy and a girl who write music together and fall in love. Musician Griffin Peterson created a soundtrack to accompany the novel. Links in the e-book or a scannable QR code in the paperback led to a website, where readers could listen to the music.

Never Never, a 2015 collaboration with Tarryn Fisher, was originally split into three parts and sold as three separate books.  The work was later republished as one complete book.

Hoover's novel, It Ends with Us, was published in 2016. Hoover described it as "the hardest book I've ever written." The novel concerns domestic violence, and, according to Hoover, it was written with the intention of advocating for domestic violence victims. The story was inspired by Hoover's personal experience as a child growing up in a household with domestic violence, which carried through her adult life. The book's main character, Lily, experiences domestic violence at a young age, witnessing her father's abuse towards her mother,  on top of experiencing it firsthand, and then, she ends up in a violent relationship, as an adult. 
In 2021, Hoover experienced a surge in popularity, due to attention from the #BookTok community on TikTok. As a result, in January 2022, It Ends with Us was #1 on The New York Times best sellers list. As of 2019, the novel had sold over a million copies worldwide, and it has been translated into over twenty languages.

A sequel to It Ends with Us, titled, It Starts with Us, was published on October 18, 2022 and published by Atria Books. Simon and Schuster released the details of the extensive marketing campaign for the novel, which became the publisher’s most pre-ordered book of all time. 

In October 2022, Simon and Schuster UK acquired two standalone novels by Hoover, which are to be published in 2024 and 2026.

As of October 2022, Hoover has sold more than 20 million books. Reflecting on Hoover's success in 2022, in particular, Alexandra Alter of The New York Times wrote, "To say she’s currently the best-selling novelist in the United States, to even compare her to other successful authors who have landed several books on the best seller lists, fails to capture the size and loyalty of her audience."

Awards and achievements

New York Times Best Sellers 
In 2022, Hoover held six of the top ten spots on the New York Times paperback fiction best seller list.

Slammed (#8)
Point of Retreat (#18)
This Girl (#9)
Hopeless (#1)
Losing Hope (#6)
Maybe Someday (#3)
Ugly Love (#4)
Confess (#4)
November 9 (#9)
It Ends with Us (#1)
Verity (#2)

Works

Books

It Ends with Us series 
 It Ends with Us (2016)
 It Starts with Us (2022)

Other novels 

 Slammed (2012)
 Point of Retreat (2012)
 This Girl (2013)
 Hopeless (2013)
 Losing Hope (2013)
 Finding Cinderella (2014) novella
 Maybe Someday (2014)
 Maybe Not (2014) novella
 Ugly Love (2014)
 Never Never (2015) three part novella series with Tarryn Fisher
 Confess (2015)
 November 9 (2015)
 Too Late (2016)
 Without Merit (2017)
 All Your Perfects (2018)
 Verity (2018)
 Maybe Now (2018)
 Finding Perfect (2019) novella 
 Regretting You (2019)
 Heart Bones (2020)
 Layla (2020)
 Reminders of Him (2022)

Source:

Short stories 
 "A Father's Kiss" from The Kiss (An Anthology of Love and Other Close Encounters)
 "Saint" from One More Step (An Anthology)
 "The Dress" from Two More Days (An Anthology)

See also 
 New adult fiction

References

External links 
 Colleen Hoover's Official Wattpad Profile

1979 births
Living people
American women novelists
American young adult novelists
People from Sulphur Springs, Texas
Novelists from Texas
Texas A&M University–Commerce alumni
21st-century American novelists
21st-century American women writers
Women writers of young adult literature
American romantic fiction novelists
Women romantic fiction writers